Joseph Armstrong may refer to:

 Joseph Armstrong (engineer) (1816–1877), locomotive engineer from Britain
 Joseph G. Armstrong (1867–1931), American politician, mayor of Pittsburgh
 Joseph L. Armstrong, American academic 
 Jim Armstrong (wrestler) (1917–1981), Australian wrestler, bronze medalist at 1948 Olympics
 Joseph Armstrong (footballer) (1892–1966), English footballer
 Joseph Elijah Armstrong (1866–1931), Canadian politician
 Joseph Hunter Armstrong, American swimmer and 2020 Olympic gold medalist

See also
 Joe Armstrong (disambiguation)
 Joey Carbstrong (born 1988), animal rights activist